XChange or X-Change may refer to:
 XChange (film), a 2000 Canadian science fiction film
 Xchange (TV series), was a BBC Children's television programme
 X-Change, a Chinese spin-off from Wife Swap which focuses on the children being swapped over
 X-Change (series), a Japanese eroge visual novel series
X-Change (visual novel), the first in the series
"X-Change", an episode of Rough Cuts on Canadian network CBC
 Boon Lay Xchange
 Fair XChange
 Game X Change, a video game retailer
 The Latin American Xchange, a Hispanic professional wrestling stable and later tag team in Total Nonstop Action Wrestling
 News Xchange, an annual conference for the international broadcast news industry
 Open-Xchange, an open source project sponsored by Open-Xchange, Inc., developing collaboration software; i.e. email, calendaring, address book, etc
 XPress XChange
 Monét X Change, American drag queen

See also
Exchange (disambiguation)